Deborah Elliott Deutschman is an American writer.

She is the author of the novel "Signals" published by Seaview Books/Simon & Schuster(1978) and PEI paperbacks (1980). Daughter of Paul Deutschman, a writer and journalist, and Louise Tolliver Deutschman, art curator and gallery director. She currently works and lives between New York City and Paris.  Her poems and short stories have appeared, over the years, in a number of places, including The New Yorker, The Alaska Quarterly Review,  Carolina Quarterly, Gargoyle, The New Criterion, New York Quarterly and Poet Lore; and translations in French literary reviews, recently in Revue Rue Saint Ambroise  and Sarrazine.

References

External links 
 Deborah Elliott Deutschman's Official Website

20th-century American novelists
21st-century American novelists
20th-century American poets
21st-century American poets
American short story writers
21st-century American writers
20th-century American women writers
21st-century American women writers
American women novelists
American women poets
American women short story writers
American science fiction writers
Living people
Year of birth missing (living people)